Marc Christopher Valdes (born December 20, 1971) is a former American professional baseball pitcher and current pitching coach for the St. Lucie Mets. He played for the Florida Marlins, Montreal Expos, Houston Astros and Atlanta Braves of Major League Baseball (MLB), and the Hanshin Tigers and Chunichi Dragons of Nippon Professional Baseball (NPB) .

Career

Amateur career
Valdes was born in Dayton, Ohio.  He attended Jesuit High School in Tampa, Florida, and played for the Tampa Jesuit Tigers high school baseball team. He graduated in 1990.

He received an athletic scholarship to attend the University of Florida, where he played for coach Joe Arnold's Florida Gators baseball team from 1991 to 1993.

Playing career
He played all or part of six seasons from - for the Florida Marlins, Montreal Expos, Houston Astros, and Atlanta Braves. He also played three seasons in Japan from - for the Hanshin Tigers and Chunichi Dragons.

Coaching career
From -, Valdes was the pitching coach for the Rookie-level Kingsport Mets. On February 3, he was named the pitching coach for the Single-A Savannah Sand Gnats. He was the pitching coach for the Binghamton Mets before becoming the current pitching coach for the St. Lucie Mets.

See also 

 Florida Gators
 List of Florida Gators baseball players

References

External links

1971 births
Living people
American expatriate baseball players in Canada
American expatriate baseball players in Japan
Atlanta Braves players
Baseball coaches from Ohio
Baseball players from Dayton, Ohio
Brooklyn Cyclones coaches
Charlotte Knights players
Chunichi Dragons players
Columbus Clippers players
Durham Bulls players
Elmira Pioneers players
Florida Gators baseball players
Florida Marlins players
Hanshin Tigers players
Houston Astros players
Jesuit High School (Tampa) alumni
Kane County Cougars players
Major League Baseball pitchers
Montreal Expos players
Nippon Professional Baseball pitchers
Orlando Rays players
Portland Sea Dogs players
Richmond Braves players
Trenton Thunder players